The Clear Fork Reservoir is a reservoir (as a man-made lake) on the Clear Fork river in the area of Richland County and Morrow County in the U.S. state of Ohio. It was designed and built in 1949 to be the main source of drinking water for the city of Mansfield, Ohio.

References

Bodies of water of Morrow County, Ohio
Bodies of water of Richland County, Ohio
Reservoirs in Ohio